William Craig Hasson (12 June 1905–1979) was a Scottish footballer who played in the Football League for Chesterfield, Millwall and Oldham Athletic.

References

1905 births
1976 deaths
Scottish footballers
Association football forwards
English Football League players
Clyde F.C. players
Oldham Athletic A.F.C. players
Millwall F.C. players
Chesterfield F.C. players